Eucalyptus campanulata, commonly known as the New England blackbutt, gum-topped peppermint or New England ash, is a tree that is endemic to eastern Australia. It has rough, finely fibrous greyish bark on the trunk and larger branches, lance-shaped to curved adult leaves, flower buds arranged in groups of between eleven and fifteen, white flowers and cup-shaped to conical fruit.

Description
The leaves are the same bluish green on both surfaces. Flowering occurs from October to December and the flowers are white.

This species is distinguished from E. andrewsii by the shape of the fruit, being bell-shaped rather than cup-shaped.

Taxonomy and naming
Eucalyptus campanulata was first formally described in 1912 by Richard Baker and Henry Smith who published the description in Journal and Proceedings of the Royal Society of New South Wales. The specific epithet (campanulata) is a Latin word meaning "bell-shaped", referring to the fruit.

Distribution and habitat
New England blackbutt is widespread and common on fertile soils in wetter areas between south-east Queensland and the southern end of Barrington Tops in New South Wales, especially on the eastern side of the Northern Tablelands.

References

 A Field Guide to Eucalypts - Brooker & Kleinig volume 1,  page 82

campanulata
Myrtales of Australia
Flora of New South Wales
Flora of Queensland
Trees of Australia
Plants described in 1912
Taxa named by Richard Thomas Baker
Taxa named by Henry George Smith